The Mayor of Long Branch, New Jersey is the chief executive officer of the city of Long Branch, New Jersey.

What is now Long Branch was split off from Shrewsbury, New Jersey, in 1849 to become Ocean Township, Monmouth County, New Jersey.  On April 11, 1867, it became the Long Branch Commission (or Board of Trade) with limited jurisdiction by three commissioners.

The city was incorporated by an act of the New Jersey Legislature on March 29, 1904 (njleg-128-0376-77) replacing the Long Branch Commission. On May 20, 1904, the city council adopted the Coult Charter as the new form of government, based on the results of a referendum on May 17, 1904, approved by voters.  It was officially an independent city. On November 7, 1960, the voters again changed the form of government from Commissioners to Manager-Council. While the council was still elected by the citizens, the mayor was selected by the nine-man council.

Since 1966, enacted by direct petition, the city is governed under the Mayor-Council (Plan A) form of municipal government, the Faulkner Act.  The government of consists of a Mayor and a five-member City Council, whose members are elected at-large in nonpartisan elections to serve four-year terms of office on a concurrent basis.  Elections, which are held in May, are non-partisan so that party affiliations of candidates are not mentioned on ballots. The inauguration of the new government takes place the following July 1.

Mayors

Gallery

See also
West Long Branch, New Jersey

References

External links

 
Long Branch